Tequila Municipality is a municipality located in the montane central zone in the State of Veracruz, about  from state capital Xalapa. Its name stems from Te-qui-lan, in the Náhuatl language which means "Place of the Vegetables in the Earth".

Geographic Limits

The municipality of  Tequila  is delimited to the north by San Andrés Tenejapan, Magdalena and Ixtaczoquitlán to the east by Omealca, to the south by Zongolica and Los Reyes and to the west by Atlahuilco. It is watered by small creeks that are a tributary of the Río Blanco.

Agriculture

It produces principally maize and coffee.

Celebrations

In Tequila, during June a celebration in honor of San Pedro, Patron of the town is held, and in December there is a celebration in honor of the Virgen de Guadalupe.

Weather

The weather in  Tequila  is very cold and wet all year with rains in summer and autumn.

References

External links 

  Municipal Official webpage
  Municipal Official Information

Municipalities of Veracruz